TV Land is an American pay television channel owned by Paramount Global through its networks division. Originally a spinoff of Nick at Nite consisting exclusively of classic television shows, the channel now airs a combination of recent and classic television series (ranging from the 1960s to the 2010s), original scripted series and limited theatrically released movies. The network is headquartered at One Astor Plaza in New York City.

TV Land is available to about 90 million households in the United States as of January 2016.

History

Launch and debut 
The network launched at 10:00 p.m. Eastern on April 29, 1996, as Nick at Nite's TV Land. Following a seven-minute short film introducing the network, the first program aired was a syndicated edit of The Best of The Ed Sullivan Show featuring the Beatles' American debut along with routines by Joan Rivers, Richard Pryor and Señor Wences. The show led off a launch-day lineup that rebroadcast numerous series premieres, pilot episodes and television firsts.

The network's original lineup consisted of Hill Street Blues; St. Elsewhere; The Ed Sullivan Show; Gunsmoke; That Girl; The Sonny & Cher Comedy Hour; Honey West; The Addams Family; Love, American Style; Petticoat Junction; Green Acres; The Phil Silvers Show; and Hogan's Heroes.

The channel launched during a time when retransmission consent was becoming more common with subscription networks and terrestrial television stations nationwide as a result of a provision in the 1992 Cable Act. However, MTV Networks offered TV Land to subscription providers for free for its five years of operation if providers would agree to add the channel to their expanded basic tiers during the 1996 calendar year. USSB, then one of two services that used the DirecTV satellite, offered TV Land as a free channel to USSB and DirecTV satellite users, without requiring a subscription, for its first years on air.

Shortly after TV Land's debut, MCA filed a lawsuit against Viacom. Because MCA's original agreement with Paramount Pictures to operate USA Network prohibited either partner from operating other pay-television networks outside the joint venture, Viacom had been in breach of contract ever since the company bought Paramount in 1994, because it had operated MTV Networks (including Nickelodeon, MTV and VH1) since its founding in 1983, and Showtime Networks (owners of Showtime, The Movie Channel and Flix) since it was founded in 1985. MCA claimed that the intention of TV Land was to compete directly with USA, a claim that turned out to be true. Viacom claimed that the matter had already been settled when Sumner Redstone released Frank Biondi from his contract to let him work at MCA. The suit was eventually settled when Viacom agreed to sell its 50% stake in USA Networks to MCA (MCA later became Universal Studios, formerly just a subsidiary, which eventually merged with NBC and, later, Comcast).

In February 1999, according to Nielsen ratings data, TV Land averaged a 1.0 share during primetime, tying ESPN for tenth place among all pay-television networks. Its siblings, MTV and VH1, tied for 17th and 26th place respectively. Columnist John Dempsey reported in Variety: "That February rating put TV Land into the top 10 for the first time since it began operating, and opened the eyes of the TV industry to the rich vein of golden-oldie TV shows that distributors are mining for an audience of nostalgia buffs and kids who are stumbling across the series for the first time."

Original programming efforts and shift to Generation X 
The network first forayed into original scripted programming in 2010 with the debut of the sitcom Hot in Cleveland (starring established sitcom stars Valerie Bertinelli, Jane Leeves, Wendie Malick and Betty White), which premiered in June 2010 to 4.75 million viewers, a record audience for the channel. (The success of that series led to a spinoff called The Soul Man, which debuted in June 2012.) This was followed by the January 19, 2011, debut of Retired at 35.

In November 2014, amid growing allegations of sexual assault against Bill Cosby, the network removed reruns of The Cosby Show from its lineup and deleted all references of the series from its website. A marathon of The Cosby Show episodes that had been scheduled for Thanksgiving was also canceled. Episodes from the Steve Harvey run of Family Feud were aired instead.

The network began a programming transition in March 2015, when the new Sutton Foster series Younger was launched without either traditional network branding or advertising. After the series finale of Hot in Cleveland, a new logo was unveiled as part of a larger rebranding that saw TV Land shift its focus to Generation X viewers who grew into the network's demographic. New original series Impastor and The Jim Gaffigan Show were unveiled as the network officially announced the rebranding on June 23, 2015. Completing the shift to edgier, single-camera programming, TV Land announced on July 28 that the upcoming fifth season of the multi-camera sitcom The Soul Man would be its last. Less than two weeks later, on August 10, TV Land's last remaining multi-camera sitcom The Exes was canceled as its fourth season was still airing, and the final episode aired on September 16.

In July 2015, TV Land dropped reruns of The Dukes of Hazzard after the removal of the Confederate battle flag from the grounds of the South Carolina State House because the flag is displayed atop the show's car, the General Lee.

2016 saw the debut of the single-camera sitcom Teachers.

Since 2017, Viacom has been reorganizing its media businesses around six flagship brands, including Paramount Pictures, BET, Comedy Central, Nickelodeon, Nick Jr. and MTV. Network president Keith Cox was reassigned to the newly rebranded Paramount Network (the former Spike), and two series originally slated for TV Land—American Woman and Heathers—were reassigned to the channel. The former was canceled after its first season, while the latter eventually aired in a heavily edited and redacted form. Younger'' was also supposed to move to Paramount Network for its sixth season, but the move was reversed before the newest season launched. The series would eventually move to Paramount+ and Hulu for its final season, with later airings on TV Land.

On August 20, 2019, two TV Land-branded channels, TV Land Drama and TV Land Sitcoms, were launched on Pluto TV, a free streaming service acquired by Viacom in March 2019. The latter channel was a rebrand of the former Pluto TV Sitcoms channel.

Programming 

TV Land's programming originally focused on television series from the 1950s to the early 1980s. Such programming continues to air during the daytime hours, while the network's primetime lineup focuses on both recent and contemporary sitcoms originating from the late 1990s. The network held its own annual award show, the TV Land Awards, from 2003 to 2016.

Canadian version 

In 2001, Craig Media launched a Category 2 pay-television specialty channel called TV Land Canada through a brand licensing agreement with Viacom (which later acquired a minority ownership stake in the channel months after its launch). On August 2, 2010, TV Land Canada was rebranded as Comedy Gold, reformatting the channel as an offshoot of The Comedy Network. The rebranded channel focuses primarily on sitcoms and sketch-comedy programs from the 1970s to the 1990s. Viacom sold back its stake in the channel to CTVglobemedia (which would later be acquired outright by minority shareholder BCE, Inc. on September 10 of that year to form Bell Media) following the rebrand. The channel was shuttered on September 1, 2019, after its broadcast license was sold to Wow Unlimited Media.

See also 
 Antenna TV – an American digital broadcast network owned by the Nexstar Media Group focusing on classic television series and movies from the 1950s to 1990s.
 Retro TV – an American digital broadcast network owned by Get After It Media focusing on classic television series from the 1950s to 1980s.
 MeTV – an American digital broadcast network owned by Weigel Broadcasting focusing on classic television series from the 1950s to 1980s.
 Cozi TV – an American digital broadcast network owned by NBCUniversal airing classic television programs from the NBCU library, along with programming from forerunner network NBC NonStop.

References

External links 

 
 

Classic television networks
Paramount Media Networks
Television channels and stations established in 1996
English-language television stations in the United States
Television networks in the United States
Nostalgia television in the United States